The House of Dietrichstein was the name of one of the oldest and most prominent Austrian noble families originating from Carinthia. The family belonged to the High Nobility, the Hochadel. The Nikolsburg (Mikulov) branch was elevated to the rank of Prince of the Holy Roman Empire in 1624, while a member of the Hollenburg branch was elevated to the same dignity in 1684. The family hold two groups of territories: the Principality of Dietrichstein, some castles in Carinthia and Moravia, and the Barony of Tarasp in Switzerland.

History

Dietrichstein Castle near Feldkirchen in the Duchy of Carinthia was first mentioned in an 1103 deed. It was probably named after one knight Dietrich in the service of the Carinthian dukes. In 1166 the Dietrichstein estates were acquired by the Prince-Bishops of Bamberg and enfeoffed to a family of ministeriales officials, who began to call themselves after the castle. When the line became extinct in the early 14th century, the fief was inherited by Nikolaus I, another Carinthian ministerialis from nearby Nussberg Castle, whose descendants also called themselves von Dietrichstein.

In the late 15th century, the strategically important fortress overlooking the trade route along the Glan valley down to Sankt Veit was occupied by the Hungarian forces of King Matthias Corvinus and finally destroyed by Ottoman invaders in 1483. A new castle was erected below the ruins about 1500 and rebuilt in a Neoclassical style in 1840.

In 1514, Siegmund von Dietrichstein (1484–1533) purchased Hollenburg Castle from his father-in-law, the Habsburg emperor Maximilian I, who also elevated him to the noble rank of a Freiherr. He was married to Barbara von Rottal (1500–1550), illegitimate daughter of Emperor Maximilian with Margareta von Edelsheim (d. 1522). In 1572, their son Baron Adam von Dietrichstein (1527–1590) was vested with the extended estates of Nikolsburg (Mikulov) in Moravia by Emperor Maximilian II. Adam's grandson Baron Maximilian II von Dietrichstein was created Graf (Count) on 18 September 1612 and his uncle, the Olomouc bishop Franz von Dietrichstein (1570–1636), was elevated as Fürst (Prince) von Dietrichstein zu Nikolsburg in 1624.

The Nikolsburg branch also acquired the titles of Princely Barony of Tarasp (immediate state of the Holy Roman Empire) in 1684, Count of Proskau in 1769, and Count Leslie of Balquhain in 1802. After the dissolution of the Holy Roman Empire in 1806 their territory was mediatized by Württemberg. The line became extinct upon the death of Prince Moritz of Dietrichstein in 1864. Four years later, Alexander von Mensdorff-Pouilly, former Austrian foreign minister and husband of Moritz' cousin Alexandrine, was vested with the princely title by Emperor Franz Joseph I. The Princes of Mensdorff-Pouilly-Dietrichstein died out in male line in 1964 in Argentina, as the last Prince only had one daughter Olga Maria de las Mercedes Theresia Margarete von Dietrichstein zu Nikolburg (b. 1932).

Princes von Dietrichstein zu Nikolsburg 

 Franz Seraph (1570–1636), First Prince of Dietrichstein, Bishop of Olomouc, Cardinal and Landeshauptmann of Moravia.
 Maximilian, Prince of Dietrichstein (1596–1655), nephew of the last
 Ferdinand Joseph, Prince of Dietrichstein (1636-1698), son of the last
 Leopold Ignaz Joseph, Prince of Dietrichstein (1660–1708), son of the last
 Walther Franz Xaver Anton, Prince of Dietrichstein (1664–1738), brother of the last
 Karl Maximilian Philipp Franz Xaver, Prince of Dietrichstein (1702–1784), son of the last
 Karl Johann Baptist Walther Sigismund Ernest Nepomuk Alois, Prince of Dietrichstein (1728–1808), son of the last
 Franz Seraph Joseph Carl Johann Nepomuc Quirin, Prince of Dietrichstein (1767–1854), son of the last
 Joseph Franz, Prince of Dietrichstein (1798–1858), son of the last
 Moritz Joseph Johann, Prince of Dietrichstein (1775–1864), son of Prince Karl Johann.

In 1857, Alexandrine, daughter of Prince Joseph Franz, married Count Alexander von Mensdorff-Pouilly. He served as Foreign Minister and Minister-President of Austria in the 1860s, and in 1868 was created Fürst von Dietrichstein zu Nikolsburg, reviving the title held by his wife's family.

 Alexander Constantin, Prince of Dietrichstein (1813–1871)
  (1858–1920), son of the last
  (1899–1964), son of the last.

The diplomat Count Albert von Mensdorff-Pouilly-Dietrichstein was a younger son of Prince Alexander Constantin.

Other notable members
 Adam of Dietrichstein (1527-1590), Austrian Ambassador to Spain.
 Philipp Sigmund of Dietrichstein (1651–1716), Order of the Golden Fleece
 Andreas Jakob von Dietrichstein (1689–1753), Prince-Archbishop of Salzburg
 Clotilde Apponyi (1867-1942), Hungarian women's rights activist and diplomat.

See also

 Mikulov Castle
 Burgruine Dietrichstein
 Dietrichstein tomb

References

Further reading
 
 

 
Moravian noble families
Austrian noble families